James Kaye is a British driver.

James Kaye is also the name of:

James Kaye (cricketer)

See also
James Kay (disambiguation)